Queen Seonjeong may refer to:

 Queen Seonjeong (Mokjong), primary wife of King Mokjong of Goryeo
 Queen Seonjeong (Sinjong), primary wife of King Sinjong of Goryeo